Joseph-Thanh Nguyen (born September 27, 1983) is an American politician who is a member of the Washington State Senate from the 34th district. Nguyen, a second-generation Vietnamese American, was raised with his three siblings in White Center, Washington, by his mother. He was a candidate for King County Executive in 2021 but was defeated by Dow Constantine 56 percent to 44 percent.

Early life and career

Nguyen was born in Seattle, Washington, as one of four children to a pair of Vietnamese immigrants who arrived in the United States as refugees. His family lived in public housing and relied on social services, particularly after his father became a quadriplegic in an accident. His mother worked as a seamstress, while Nguyen himself worked at his own high school as a janitor.

He graduated from John F. Kennedy Catholic High School in Burien after serving as class president for three years. Nguyen attended Seattle University and served as student body president for two years before graduating with Bachelor of Arts degrees in finance and humanities with a minor in economics. Nguyen worked as a senior strategist for Expedia and is a senior program manager at Microsoft with an emphasis on strategy and analytics. He has been involved in the company's charitable education program.

Nguyen chaired the Associate Board of Wellspring Family Services, a nonprofit organization for homeless services. During his time on the board, the state legislature passed trauma counseling legislation on behalf of Wellspring's lobbying. He also served on the King County Community Advisory Committee on Law Enforcement Oversight, which included criticism of the King County Sheriff's handling of the shooting of Tommy Le in June 2017. Le, a young Vietnamese American man, was shot by officers in Burien who were cleared of wrongdoing by an internal investigation of the Sheriff's Office, inciting outrage in the Vietnamese community. He volunteers at a local homeless encampment, Camp Second Chance, with his daughter.

Political career

Elections

Nguyen announced his candidacy for the 34th district senate seat in May 2018, shortly after incumbent Sharon Nelson decided to retire at the end of her term. The 34th district includes White Center, West Seattle, Vashon Island, and part of Burien. He aimed to increase the representation of people of color in government and "for people here to realize they have the power, the authority, to actually make positive change", also launching a podcast series to attract other potential candidates. Nguyen finished at the top of the primary with 31 percent of the vote, ahead of ten other candidates, and advanced to the general election alongside Shannon Braddock, a staffer to King County Executive Dow Constantine.

Nguyen, running as a Democrat, campaigned on a platform that focused on housing affordability, healthcare for all, public transit improvements, environmental protections, and education reform. He received the endorsements of congresswoman Pramila Jayapal, several Seattle and Burien council members, various local unions, and The Stranger. His campaign declined to use PAC funding, raising half as much as Braddock's campaign. Nguyen won the general election on November 6, 2018, defeating Braddock with 58 percent of the vote. He became one of the first two Vietnamese American legislators to be elected to the Washington State Legislature, alongside My-Linh Thai from the 41st district.

In April 2021 he announced he'd challenge incumbent Dow Constantine, who's running for his fourth term and formerly represented the 34th District in the State Senate, for the office of King County Executive.

Legislative accomplishments

In March 2020, Nguyen sponsored, and the legislature passed, a bill curtailing the use of facial recognition by the government and required government agencies to report facial recognition usage.

In April 2020, Nguyen sponsored, and the legislature passed, a bill expanding access to Washington State's Temporary Assistance for Needy Families Program, allowing families without regular housing to receive funds for more than the allotted 60 days.

In April 2021, Nguyen sponsored, and the legislature passed, a bill (SB 5055) transforming arbitration over police disciplinary actions in Washington state. Under the new framework, the Washington State Public Employment Relations Commission must create and appoint a roster of 9 to 18 new arbitrators who are then in charge of all discipline arbitrations for police covered by a collective bargaining agreement. The new law also provides more transparency to the public by collecting in one place all police discipline-related arbitrations and making those decisions available to the public.

Personal life

Nguyen is married to Tallie Nguyen, a special education teacher at the Highline Public Schools. They have three children and live in West Seattle.

References

Democratic Party Washington (state) state senators
Living people
Politicians from Seattle
Seattle University alumni
21st-century American politicians
People from King County, Washington
1983 births
American politicians of Vietnamese descent